The Battle of Tighina, Battle of Bender or Battle of Bendery may refer to:

 Skirmish at Bender at 1713, fought between the Swedish Empire and the Ottoman Empire, which was an Ottoman victory
 Battle of Tighina (1789), fought between the Russian Empire and the Ottoman Empire; Russian victory
 Battle of Tighina (1918), fought between the Kingdom of Romania and the Rumcherod, a Soviet revolutionary committee; Romanian victory
 Bender Uprising in 1919, orchestrated by Bolshevik local groups against Romanian rule; Romanian victory
 Battle of Tighina (1992), fought between the Moldova and Transnistria during the Transnistria War; Russian-backed Transnistrian victory